The European Review of Economic History is an international peer-reviewed academic journal published three times per year. It was formerly edited by Cambridge University Press and is currently edited by Oxford University Press. It is edited in association with the European Historical Economics Society.

The journal intends to be a publishing outlet for research into European, comparative and world economic history, through the medium of research articles, shorter note and comments, debates, surveys and review articles.

The current editors are Kerstin Enflo (Lund University), Joan R. Rosés (London School of Economics) and Christopher M. Meissner (UC Davis).

Ranking and reputation 
It is considered one of the best economic history journals along with the Journal of Economic History, Explorations in Economic History and the Economic History Review. In 2022, its impact factor was 1.706.

References

Economic history journals
European history journals
Publications established in 1997
Cambridge University Press academic journals
Triannual journals
English-language journals
Academic journals associated with international learned and professional societies of Europe